Vasoactive intestinal polypeptide receptor 1 also known as VPAC1, is a protein, that in humans is encoded by the VIPR1 gene. VPAC1 is expressed in the brain (cerebral cortex, hippocampus, amygdala), lung, prostate, peripheral blood leukocytes, liver, small intestine, heart, spleen, placenta, kidney, thymus and testis.

Function 
 
VPAC1 is a receptor for vasoactive intestinal peptide (VIP), a small neuropeptide. Vasoactive intestinal peptide is involved in smooth muscle relaxation, exocrine and endocrine secretion, and water and ion flux in lung and intestinal epithelia. Its actions are effected through integral membrane receptors associated with a guanine nucleotide binding protein which activates adenylate cyclase.

VIP acts in an autocrine fashion via VPAC11 to inhibit megakaryocyte proliferation and induce proplatelet formation.

Clinical significance 
Patients with idiopathic achalasia show a significant difference in the distribution of SNPs affecting VIPR1.

VIP and PACAP levels were decreased in anterior vaginal wall of stress urinary incontinence and pelvic organ prolapse patients, they may participate in the pathophysiology of these diseases.

See also 
 Vasoactive intestinal peptide receptor

References

Further reading 

 
 
 
 
 
 
 
 
 
 
 
 
 
 
 
 
 
 
 
 

G protein-coupled receptors